Dundaff Creek is a tributary of East Branch Tunkhannock Creek in Susquehanna County and Lackawanna County, in Pennsylvania, in the United States. The creek has no named tributaries and is not designated as an impaired waterbody.

The valley of Dundaff Creek has is relatively deep and not very asymmetric. Flooding has occurred along the creek, and has occasionally impacted the community of Clifford. Communities along the creek include Clifford and Dundaff. A number of bridges have been constructed over Dundaff Creek in both Susquehanna County and Lackawanna County. The watershed of the creek is designated as a Coldwater Fishery and a Migratory Fishery except for the watershed of an unnamed tributary, which is designated as a Warmwater Fishery and a Migratory Fishery. Wild trout naturally reproduce in the creek and there are wetlands at its headwaters, which are listed on the Susquehanna County Natural Areas Inventory.

Course
Dundaff Creek begins in a wetland in Clifford Township, Susquehanna County. It flows northwest for a few tenths of a mile before turning west-southwest and entering another wetland. After a few tenths of a mile, the creek turns southwest for several tenths of a mile, receiving one unnamed tributary from the left before entering a third wetland, where it receives an unnamed tributary from the right. It continues flowing southwest before crossing Pennsylvania Route 247 and turning west-southwest for a few tenths of a mile, receiving one unnamed tributary from the left and one from the right. The creek then turns south-southwest for several tenths of a mile, exiting Susquehanna County.

Upon exiting Susquehanna County, Dundaff Creek enters Greenfield Township, Lackawanna County. It flows south for a few tenths of a mile before gradually turning west, beginning to flow alongside Pennsylvania Route 106 as it receives two more unnamed tributaries (one from the left and one from the right) before crossing the highway. The creek then turns north-northwest for a few tenths of a mile alongside Pennsylvania Route 106 before turning west-southwest. After several tenths of a mile, it turns north, receiving an unnamed tributary from the left and reentering Clifford Township, Susquehanna County. Here, the creek flows north for several tenths of a mile, receiving an unnamed tributary from the left and crossing Pennsylvania Route 106. It then turns northwest for several tenths of a mile before reaching its confluence with East Branch Tunkhannock Creek.

Hydrology
Dundaff Creek is not designated as an impaired waterbody.

At the Lackawanna County/Susquehanna County line, the peak annual discharge of Dundaff Creek has a 10 percent chance of reaching . It has a 2 percent chance of reaching  and a 1 percent chance of reaching . The peak annual discharge has a 0.2 percent chance of reaching .

It has a 2 percent chance of reaching  and a 1 percent chance of reaching . The peak annual discharge has a 0.2 percent chance of reaching .

Geography and geology

The valley of Dundaff Creek was one of the most transverse to ice flow during the Ice Age of any stream valley in the United States Geological Survey quadrangle of Clifford. The creek's valley has been described as "deeply incised" and is not very asymmetric. There are very thick layers of till on the north side and bedrock on the south side.

The surficial geology along the lower reaches of Dundaff Creek mainly consists of alluvium, with some patches of wetland and Wisconsinan Outwash nearby and Wisconsinan Till on the side of the valley. Further upstream, the surficial geology along the creek is still predominantly alluvium, but the alluvium band is thinner, with Wisconsinan Till coming much closer to the creek. There are also patches of bedrock consisting of sandstone and shale nearby, as well as a patch of Wisconsinan Outwash, a patch of alluvial fan and a much smaller patch of Wisconsinan Ice-Contact Stratified Drift. Near the creek's headwaters, the surficial geology consists mainly of Wisconsinan Till and bedrock, with some wetlands.

Watershed
The creek is entirely within the United States Geological Survey quadrangle of Clifford. Its mouth is located within  of Clifford and the community of Dundaff is located near the headwaters.

At times, major flooding has caused inundation of some structures in localized areas in the vicinity of Dundaff Creek. The village of Clifford has also been impacted by flooding from the creek at times.

The designated use for Dundaff Creek is aquatic life. The headwaters of the creek are listed on the Susquehanna County Natural Areas Inventory.

The forests surrounding wetlands at the headwaters of Dundaff Creek are fragmented by agricultural land in some areas. There is also accelerating residential development to the south of the wetlands, and many wetlands in Susquehanna County are in danger of being flooded for recreational purposes.

History
Dundaff Creek was entered into the Geographic Names Information System on August 2, 1979. Its identifier in the Geographic Names  Information System is 1173604.

A dam known as the Dundaff Dam was constructed on Dundaff Creek in 1956 in Greenfield Township, Lackawanna County. It was privately owned and built by a rod and gun club for recreation purposes. The removal of the dam improved an estimated  of stream habitat.

In 2013, the bridge carrying State Route 2008 (Airport Road) over Dundaff Creek had its weight limit set to 33 tons, or 39 tons for combination loads. This was one of about a thousand bridges in Pennsylvania whose weight limits were changed at that time. A bridge carrying Creamery Road over Dundaff Creek in Clifford Township, Susquehanna County was closed for reconstruction in August 2015 as part of a Public-Private Partnership to repair 558 bridges in Pennsylvania. Although there were several construction delays, the bridge was reopened on March 15, 2016. Two new Pennsylvania-funded bridges carrying Pennsylvania Route 247 over the creek are slated for completion in 2018 and 2020, for a cost of $350,000 and $300,000, respectively.

Biology
Wild trout naturally reproduce in Dundaff Creek from its headwaters downstream to its mouth.

The wetlands at the headwaters of Dundaff Creek are probably mainly impoundments influenced by beavers, plus the occasional shrub swamp and sedge grass marshes with a northern hardwood matrix. One peatland or bog habitat in the area is surrounded by a large hemlock swamp forest. Additionally, an animal species of concern was observed in the wetlands in 1985.

See also
Idlewild Creek, next tributary of East Branch Tunkhannock Creek going downstream
Tinker Creek, next tributary of East Branch Tunkhannock Creek going upstream
List of rivers of Pennsylvania

References

Rivers of Susquehanna County, Pennsylvania
Rivers of Lackawanna County, Pennsylvania
Tributaries of Tunkhannock Creek
Rivers of Pennsylvania